is a Japanese manga series written and illustrated by Shinji Mizushima. It follows Yūki Mizuhara, a young woman who wants to do veterinary medicine at college but instead she became a baseball player. It was originally serialized in the Kodansha's Japanese manga magazine Weekly Shōnen Magazine between 1972 and 1976, and has been adapted into several spin-off manga, a live-action film, an anime television series, an anime film, and a Japanese television drama. In 1973, it received the 4th Kōdansha Literature Culture Award for children's manga.

Media

Manga 
The Yakyū-kyō no Uta manga series was written and illustrated by Shinji Mizushima, and originally serialized by Kodansha in Weekly Shōnen Magazine from 1972 to 1976. It was published into a single tankōbon volume on October 1, 1972, on June 16, 1974, on January 25, 1976, and on January 21, 1979. Between July 12, 1995 and October 12, 1995, it was published in 13 bunkoban. A four-shinsōban version subtitled  was released between November 21, 1997 and June 23, 1998.

In 1997, a new series entitled  started to be serialized by Kodansha in Mister Magazine. Later, it was collected into 3 tankōbon released between August 7, 1998 and March 9, 2000.  was serialized from 2000 to 2005 in Comic Morning, and published on 11 tankōbon between January 23, 2001 and October 21, 2005.

A crossover manga between Yakyū-kyō no Uta and Dokaben, another Mizushima manga, was first published in 2005. On February 8, 2006, it was released by Kodansha in a bound volume under the title .

On February 10, 2009, a series entitled , that follows the story of Yūki Mizuhara, a real-life female baseball player, started to be published. Spawning three bound volumes, it was last published on April 10, 2009 by Kodansha.

Live-action film 
Akira Katō directed a live-action adaptation that was released on March 19, 1977. It starred Midori Kinouchi, was produced by Hiromi Higuchi, written by Masayasu Ōehara and Rokurō Kumagaya, and its score was composed by Shin Takada.

Cast
 Midori Kinouchi as Yuki MIzuhara
 Asao Koike as Tetsugoro Iwata
 Hiroshi Inuzuka as Mizuhara
 Katsuya Nomura as himself
 Kei Tani as Sentaro
 Jūkei Fujioka as Matsukawa

Anime 
A 25-episode anime television series was created by Nippon Animation, and was broadcast on Fuji Television between December 23, 1977 and March 26, 1979. An anime film titled  was released in theatres on September 15, 1979 and shown together with the first Future Boy Conan compilation movie. It is an adaptation of chapters 13 and 14: "Kita no Ōkami, Minami no Tora" Part 1 and Part 2.

TV drama 
The series was adapted into a live-action Japanese television drama broadcast on January 7, 1985 on Fuji Television. It starred Yuki Saito as Yūki Mizuhara and Shirō Itō as Tetsugorō Iwata.

References

External links 

1977 anime television series debuts
1979 Japanese television series endings
Anime series based on manga
Baseball in anime and manga
Animated films based on manga
Fuji TV original programming
Kodansha manga
Manga adapted into films
Nippon Animation
Shōnen manga
Nikkatsu Roman Porno
Live-action films based on manga